John Baer (June 6, 1923 – January 7, 2006) was an American actor. He appeared in over 60 film and television productions between 1950 and 1974. Among the highlights of his career was the leading role in the television series Terry and the Pirates (1953). One of his better-known film roles was as Paul Trochard, the greedy heir who gets killed by a snake, in Michael Curtiz's comedy We're No Angels (1955). While he spent most of his film career in supporting roles or bit parts, Baer also played the lead role in Night of the Blood Beast, a horror film by Gene and Roger Corman.

When his roles declined during the 1960s, Baer started a second career in real estate business. He retired from acting after a guest appearance in Gunsmoke in 1974.

Partial filmography 

 The West Point Story (1950) - Young Cadet (uncredited)
 The Flying Missile (1950) - Jet Pilot (uncredited)
 Operation Pacific (1951) - Fighter Pilot (uncredited)
 Target Unknown (1951) - Pilot (uncredited)
 Air Cadet (1951) - Cadet (uncredited)
 Fighting Coast Guard (1951) - Upper-Classman (uncredited)
 Saturday's Hero (1951) - Turner Wylie (uncredited)
 Arizona Manhunt (1951) - Deputy Jim Brown
 The Family Secret (1951) - Boy at Birthday Party (uncredited)
 Superman and the Mole Men (1951) - Dr. Reed (uncredited)
 Indian Uprising (1952) - Lt. Whitley
 About Face (1952) - Hal Carlton
 The Battle at Apache Pass (1952) - Pvt. Bolin (uncredited)
 Rainbow 'Round My Shoulder (1952) - Red (uncredited)
 Stars and Stripes Forever (1952) - Chorus Boy at 'El Capitan' Rehearsal (uncredited)
 Above and Beyond (1952) - Captain (uncredited)
 Terry and the Pirates (1952-1953, TV series, 18 episodes) - Terry Lee
 The Mississippi Gambler (1953) - Laurent Dureau
 Down Among the Sheltering Palms (1953) - Officer (uncredited)
 Three Sailors and a Girl (1953) - Sailor (uncredited)
 Riding Shotgun (1954) - Deputy Ross Hughes
 The Miami Story (1954) - Ted Delacorte
 City of Shadows (1955) - Dan Mason
 We're No Angels (1955) - Paul Trochard
 Huk! (1956) - Bart Rogers
 Night of the Blood Beast (1958) - Steve Dunlap
 Tarawa Beachhead (1958) - Johnny Campbell
 Guns Girls and Gangsters (1959) - Steve Thomas
 Hawaiian Eye (1960, TV series, 2 episodes) - Alan Terry / Victor Brindisi
 The Cat Burglar (1961) - Alan Sheridan
Fear No More (1961) - Keith Burgess
 The Chapman Report (1962) - Boy Barclay (uncredited)
 Leave It to Beaver (1962, TV series, 1 episode) - Assistant
 The Beverly Hillbillies (1966, TV series, 1 episode) - Nelson
 Bikini Paradise (1967) - Lt. Anthony Crane
 The Late Liz (1971) - Arthur Bryson
 Bonnie's Kids (1972)
 Mission: Impossible (1973, TV series, 1 episode) - Belden
 Gunsmoke (1973-1974, TV series, 2 episodes) - Nichols / Johnny's father (final appearance)

Selected Television

References

External links 
 
 
 John Baer at Aveleyman

1923 births
2006 deaths
20th-century American male actors
American male television actors